The 1989 South Australian state election was held on 25 November 1989.

Retiring Members

Labor
Roy Abbott MHA (Spence)
Gavin Keneally MHA (Stuart)
Terry McRae MHA (Playford)
Ron Payne MHA (Mitchell)
Keith Plunkett MHA (Peake)
Jack Slater MHA (Gilles)

House of Assembly
Sitting members are shown in bold text. Successful candidates are highlighted in the relevant colour. Where there is possible confusion, an asterisk (*) is also used.

Legislative Council
Sitting members are shown in bold text. Tickets that elected at least one MLC are highlighted in the relevant colour. Successful candidates are identified by an asterisk (*). Eleven seats were up for election. Labor were defending five seats. The Liberals were defending five seats. The Democrats were defending one seat.

References

Candidates for South Australian state elections
1989 elections in Australia
1980s in South Australia